Balak ( Bālāq) was a king of Moab described in the Book of Numbers in the Hebrew Bible, where his dealings with the prophet Balaam are recounted. Balak tried to engage Balaam for the purpose of cursing the migrating Israelite community. On his journey to meet the princes of Moab, Balaam is stopped by an angel of the lord after beating his donkey. He tells the angel he will return home: "I have sinned, for I did not know that you stood against me on the road". The angel instructs Balaam to attend the meeting with the princes of Moab but to "say only what I tell you". According to Numbers 22:2, and Joshua 24:9, Balak was the son of Zippor.

In the preceding chapter of Numbers, the Israelites, seeking the Promised Land following their Exodus from Egypt, had defeated the Canaanites at a place named Hormah, as well as the Amorites and the people of Bashan, and next approached Moab. The biblical narrative stresses the fears of the people of Moab, who were 'exceedingly afraid' and 'sick with dread' (NKJV) or 'terrified' (GNT). Their fears appear to relate to the size of the Israelite population and the consequent resource depletion which could be expected if they were permitted to occupy Moabite land.

Balak initially conferred with his Midianite allies in order to block Israelite settlement, before sending his elders (along with Midianite elders) to seek Balaam's curse on them. The Midianites appear to have been co-located with the Moabites - according to the Targum of Jonathan, they were one alliance of people at this time  and therefore had a common interest in preventing Israelite settlement of the area.

After his mission with Balaam to curse Israelites failed, Balak decided to ally with Midianites to gather their women in order to lead Israelites men astray in adultery.

Sources detailing the story of Balak:

 
  - This is the only time in the Bible that Balak is not mentioned in direct conjunction with Balaam. 
 

According to the Pulpit Commentary, Balak seems to be mentioned by name on a papyrus in the British Museum. In 2019, Israel Finkelstein, Nadav Na'aman and Thomas Römer proposed the common reading of "House of David" in the Mesha Stele is actually "Balak".

The Zohar

The Zohar, the basic text of the Kabbalah, offers a special interpretation to the Balak being "The Son of Zippor". In Hebrew, "Zippor" (ציפור) means "bird". According to the Zohar, this was not the name of Balak's father but rather referred to a magical metal bird which Balak made use of. As the Zohar recounts, such a bird has a head made of gold, a mouth made of silver and wings made of copper mixed with silver, and its body is made of gold; once the bird is made, it should be put during the day in a window facing the Sun and during the night in a window facing the Moon, while burning incense in front of it for seven days and seven nights. Thereupon, the bird would start talking and foretelling of what is about to happen. Only the most skilled of wizards could construct such a bird. Balak, the greatest wizard of his age, managed it. The bird was always sitting on Balak's shoulder and whispering in his ear, and therefore he was nicknamed "Son of the Bird". The Zohar further recounts that the bird spoke true words of prophecy in Balak's ear and warned him not to set himself against the Sons of Israel, and also foretold of the harsh punishment in store for himself and for the Moabits. Nevertheless, Balak persisted in his wrong way and was punished exactly as the bird foretold.

New Testament
Revelation 2:12 - 2:14 refers to Balak.

Apocrypha
Balak is mentioned in chapter 10 of 2 Meqabyan, a book considered canonical in the Ethiopian Orthodox Tewahedo Church.

Weekly Torah Portion
Balak is the name of the weekly parshah or portion in the annual Jewish cycle of Torah reading, constituting  which tells the story of Balak.

Etymology 

There are various proposed etymologies for the name Balak, all having to do with children or "waste" - The name Balak is in modern times claimed to come from the sparsely used Hebrew verb (balaq), waste or lay waste (Isaiah 24:1,3; Jeremiah 51:2). There are no derivations of this verb besides this name. Other proposals are: Devastator (BDB Theological Dictionary), Empty (NOBS Study Bible Name List), or Wasting (Jones' Dictionary of Old Testament Proper Names).

References

Book of Numbers people
Book of Joshua
Book of Judges monarchs
Book of Micah
Moab
Book of Revelation
Torah monarchs